Thomas Brown (born May 15, 1986) is an American football coach and former running back who is the offensive coordinator for the Carolina Panthers of the National Football League (NFL). Brown previously served as the offensive coordinator and running backs coach at the University of Miami. He played college football at Georgia. Thereafter, he played professionally in the NFL for the Atlanta Falcons and the Cleveland Browns.

College career
Brown was a freshman All-SEC selection after totaling 172 carries for 875 yards and eight touchdowns as well as 16 receptions for 150 yards, amassing 1,043 all-purpose yards. He had 100-yard games against Vanderbilt Commodores, Arkansas Razorbacks, Kentucky Wildcats, and Wisconsin Badgers. In addition to his All-SEC selection, he was the recipient of the Offensive Newcomer of the Year Award and the team’s Victors Club Award.

Brown continued to be productive in his second year, starting all 12 games and leading the Bulldogs with 736 yards and four touchdowns on 147 attempts. He added 67 yards on six receptions and returned two kickoffs for 19 yards. His season-high of 146 rushing yards on 20 carries against South Carolina. A 9-yard halfback touchdown pass to quarterback Joe Tereshinski, playing for the injured D.J. Shockley, came against the Florida Gators. Brown also ran for a career-long 52-yard touchdown against West Virginia in the 2006 Nokia Sugar Bowl.

He started in five of seven games while registering 62 carries for 256 yards and one touchdown and also added seven catches for 71 yards. He returned 15 kickoffs for 379 yards with a school record 99-yard kickoff return against Tennessee. He averaged 100.9 all-purpose yards per game after tallying 706 for the season. A torn ACL against Vanderbilt sidelined Brown for the rest of the season.

Brown rushed for 779 yards on 148 attempts and 10 touchdowns in his senior season at Georgia despite sitting out for three games with a broken collarbone and splitting playing time with talented redshirt freshman Knowshon Moreno. He also caught 10 passes for 84 yards and two scores. Returned 15 kickoffs for 333 yards (22.2 avg.) while amassing 1,196 all-purpose yards, an average of 119.6 yards per game.

During his senior season, Brown was named SEC Offensive Player of the Week after running for a career-high 180 yards and three touchdowns against the University of Mississippi.  Appeared in 10 games, starting in six, including the  2008 Sugar Bowl against Hawaii.

Professional career

Atlanta Falcons
Brown was drafted by the Atlanta Falcons in the sixth round of the 2008 NFL Draft. His rookie season was cut short by a horse collar tackle during the preseason, landing him on injured reserve. He was waived prior to the following season on September 5, 2009.

Cleveland Browns
Brown was signed to the Cleveland Browns practice squad on November 10, 2009. He was promoted to the active roster on January 2, 2010 after linebacker David Veikune was placed on injured reserve. He was released June 17, 2010.

Coaching career

Early Coaching Career
In 2012, Brown was hired as running backs coach for the Chattanooga Mocs. In 2013, Brown was hired at the same position for the Marshall Thundering Herd.

Wisconsin
On February 24, 2014, Brown was hired to be the Wisconsin Badgers running back coach.

Georgia
On February 16, 2015, Brown returned to his alma mater as the running backs coach at University of Georgia under head coach Mark Richt, under whom Brown played.  The move united the position coach of the 2014 NCAA rushing yards leader, Melvin Gordon, with one of the nation's most prolific returning running backs in Nick Chubb.

Miami
On December 30, 2015, Brown was hired to be the running backs coach and offensive coordinator at the University of Miami, where he would work under Mark Richt again.

South Carolina
On January 9, 2019, Brown was named the running backs coach at the University of South Carolina.

Los Angeles Rams
On February 12, 2020, Brown joined the Los Angeles Rams coaching staff as running backs coach. He was given the additional title of assistant head coach on February 23, 2021. Brown won Super Bowl LVI when the Rams defeated the Cincinnati Bengals 23-20. In 2022 he transitioned from running backs coach to the team’s tight ends coach while retaining the assistant head coach title.

Carolina Panthers
On February 17, 2023, Brown was hired as an offensive coordinator by the Carolina Panthers.

References

External links
 Carolina Panthers bio

1986 births
Living people
African-American coaches of American football
African-American players of American football
American football running backs
Atlanta Falcons players
Carolina Panthers coaches
Cleveland Browns players
Chattanooga Mocs football coaches
Georgia Bulldogs football coaches
Georgia Bulldogs football players
Los Angeles Rams coaches
Marshall Thundering Herd football coaches
Miami Hurricanes football coaches
People from Tucker, Georgia
Players of American football from Georgia (U.S. state)
South Carolina Gamecocks football coaches
Sportspeople from DeKalb County, Georgia
Wisconsin Badgers football coaches
21st-century African-American sportspeople
20th-century African-American people
National Football League offensive coordinators